Samuel Seth Ashton (born 9 October 1986) is an English footballer who plays as a goalkeeper for English non-League side Skelmersdale United. He has previously played for Bolton Wanderers, FC United of Manchester, Bootle, Southport, Chorley, Ramsbottom United, Radcliffe, Macclesfield

Career

Bolton Wanderers
Ashton began his professional football career at Bolton Wanderers and, on 7 January 2006, was named as the substitute goalkeeper for Bolton's FA Cup Third Round tie against Watford. However, he came on for the last few minutes of the match as a striker, replacing Jared Borgetti. Ashton also made 18 appearances for the Bolton Wanderers Reserves during his time at the Reebok.

Described by his boss as "the best and most staunch Bolton Wanderers fan in our camp", then Bolton manager Sam Allardyce explained: "He wears a massive tattoo with the club badge on it. He comes from the heart of Bolton and he loves the club so much and is so passionate. He just asked if he could get on for a couple of minutes. We were always ready to play him outfield as he has played at right-back and centre-back for the youth team. I thought it would be a perfect late Christmas present."

Towards the end of the 2005–06 season he was told that he was free to leave Bolton and spent considerable time on trial with non-League sides such as Cambridge United and Radcliffe Borough.

F.C. United of Manchester
On 26 July 2006, he made his debut for FC United of Manchester in a friendly against Bury. He has since made his competitive debut for United of Manchester against St Helens Town, in the first game of the 2006–07 North West Counties Football League Division One season, keeping a clean sheet in a 2–0 victory for the away team, played at Knowsley Road. After 140 appearances for the club, he reached a landmark 50th clean sheet on 4 April 2009 against North Ferriby United. Against Brighton & Hove Albion in the FA Cup Second Round he saved a penalty in the last minute to earn United of Manchester a replay.

He scored his first career goal in a 4–0 win away to Retford United on 15 January 2011. The ball got caught up in the wind and lobbed the opposing goalkeeper.

He left the club in July 2011 in order to secure more first team football.

Skelmersdale United
Ashton joined Skelmersdale United  after leaving F.C. United. In March 2012 he also joined Southport on dual registration forms.

Chorley
In May 2013 Ashton joined Northern Premier League Premier Division side Chorley. He was a part of the Chorley team that won the Northern Premier League and gained promotion to the Conference North in 2014. In October 2016 Ashton was ruled out for the season for Chorley with a crucial ligament injury.

Ramsbottom United
In January 2018 he signed for Ramsbottom United after playing two games for Kendal Town over the Christmas period.

Lancaster City
In June 2019 he signed for Lancaster City.

Radcliffe
He signed for Northern Premier League Premier Division side Radcliffe on a free transfer in August 2021.

Macclesfield
In late 2021 Ashton signed for Macclesfield F.C. in the Northwest Counties Premier Division. Macclesfield went on to win the league in their first season and gained promotion to the Northern Premier League Division One West.

Career statistics

Honours
Individual
2010–11 FA Cup Player of the Round (1): Second Round Proper

References

External links

1986 births
Living people
English footballers
Association football goalkeepers
Bolton Wanderers F.C. players
F.C. United of Manchester players
Skelmersdale United F.C. players
Chorley F.C. players
Southport F.C. players
Kendal Town F.C. players
Ramsbottom United F.C. players
Lancaster City F.C. players
Radcliffe F.C. players
Northern Premier League players
National League (English football) players
Macclesfield F.C. players
North West Counties Football League players